Sophronia aquilex is a moth of the family Gelechiidae. It was described by Edward Meyrick in 1926. It is found in South Africa.

References

Endemic moths of South Africa
Moths described in 1926
Sophronia (moth)